Stading is a Swedish surname. Notable people with the surname include:

 Evelina Stading (1797–1829), Swedish painter
 Franziska Stading (1763–1836), Swedish opera singer

Swedish-language surnames